South Shields by-election may refer to:
1910 South Shields by-election
1916 South Shields by-election
1918 South Shields by-election
2013 South Shields by-election

See also
South Shields (UK Parliament constituency)